Central Hall can refer to:

Australia
Central Hall, Adelaide, South Australia, a now-demolished building built in 1894
Central Hall, Melbourne, part of the Australian Catholic University
Central Hall, Little Collins Street, Baptist hall in Melbourne

United Kingdoom
Methodist Central Hall, Birmingham, a former Methodist hall
Grand Central Hall, Liverpool, a former Methodist hall
Methodist Central Hall, Westminster, London, a former Methodist hall

United States
Central Hall (Sea Cliff, New York), a historic commercial building in Nassau County, New York

See also
Central-passage house or central hall plan house, a vernacular floor plan
Second Floor Center Hall, in the White House, Washington D.C.

Architectural disambiguation pages